Geraldo D. Joseph Scarpone Caporale, O.F.M. (October 1, 1928 – October 29, 2016) was an American-born Honduran Roman Catholic bishop.

Ordained to the priesthood in 1956, Scarpone Caporale served as Coadjutor Bishop of the Roman Catholic Diocese of Comayagua, Honduras, from January 1979 and in May of the same year he became Diocesan Bishop until his retirement in 2004.

Notes

1928 births
2016 deaths
People from Watertown, Massachusetts
Franciscan bishops
20th-century Roman Catholic bishops in Honduras
21st-century Roman Catholic bishops in Honduras
Roman Catholic bishops of Comayagua